Acanthomuricea is a genus of corals belonging to the family Plexauridae.

The species of this genus are found in Malesia, Southern Africa.

Species:

Acanthomuricea biserialis 
Acanthomuricea dina 
Acanthomuricea mberea 
Acanthomuricea pulchra 
Acanthomuricea purpurea 
Acanthomuricea ramosa 
Acanthomuricea silpa 
Acanthomuricea uimea

References

Plexauridae
Octocorallia genera